The 1916 South Dakota gubernatorial election was held on November 7, 1916. Incumbent Republican Governor Frank M. Byrne declined to seek re-election to a third term. Lieutenant Governor Peter Norbeck won the Republican primary to succeed him, and in the general election faced State Representative Orville V. Rinehart. Norbeck won his first term as Governor in a landslide over Rinehart.

Primary elections
Primary elections were held on May 23, 1916.

Democratic primary

Candidates
 Orville V. Rinehart, former State Representative from Pennington County
 Edmund D. Morcom, businessman

Results

Republican primary

Candidates
 Peter Norbeck, Lieutenant Governor
 George W. Egan, disbarred attorney, 1912 Republican candidate for Governor, 1910 Republican candidate for Governor
 Richard Olsen Richards, perennial candidate

Results

Prohibition primary

Candidates
C. K. Thompson, Prohibition candidate for Governor in 1914

Results

Socialist primary

Candidates
Fred L. Fairchild, Socialist candidate for South Dakota's 3rd congressional district in 1914

Results

General election

Candidates
Orville V. Rinehart, Democratic
Peter Norbeck, Republican
C. K. Thompson, Prohibition
Fred L. Fairchild, Socialist

Results

References

Bibliography
 

1916
South Dakota
Gubernatorial
November 1916 events